The 13th arrondissement of Paris (XIIIe arrondissement) is one of the 20 arrondissements of the capital city of France. In spoken French, this arrondissement is referred to as treizième.

The arrondissement, called Gobelins, is situated on the left bank of the River Seine. It is home to Paris's principal Asian community, the Quartier Asiatique, located in the southeast of the arrondissement in an area that contains many high-rise apartment buildings. The neighborhood features a high concentration of Chinese and Vietnamese businesses.

The 13th arrondissement is also home to the Bibliothèque François Mitterrand and the newly built business district of Paris Rive Gauche.

Demographics
The 13th arrondissement is still growing in population, mainly because of an influx of Asian immigrants. During the late 1970s and early 1980s, the first wave of Vietnamese refugees from the Vietnam War settled in the arrondissement, largely concentrated near Masséna Boulevard. Later waves of refugees and Asian immigrants transitioned from being exclusively ethnic Vietnamese to include ethnic Chinese from Vietnam, Laotians and Cambodians. These migrants largely settled in the southern area of the arrondissement, creating an Asian quarter and establishing a commercial district and community institutions. Teochew, Cantonese, Vietnamese, Lao and Khmer are spoken by many residents in the community.

At the last census in 1999, the population was 171,533. The 13th arrondissement is also rapidly growing in business activity, thanks to the new business district of Paris Rive Gauche. In 1999, the arrondissement contained 89,316 jobs, and it is believed to contain more today.

Historical population

Immigration

Map

Economy
The head office of Accor, including the company's executive management, is in the Immeuble Odyssey in the 13th arrondissement. This facility is the company's registered office.

Ubisoft has its business office in the arrondissement.

Education

Senior high schools:
 Lycée Rodin
 Lycée Claude-Monet
 Lycée professionnel Corvisart-Tolbiac
 École nationale de chimie physique et biologie de Paris
 École Yabné
 Groupe scolaire Notre Dame de France
 Groupe scolaire Saint Vincent de Paul
 Lycée Le Rebours
 Lycée Technique Privé de l'École Technique Supérieure du Laboratoire

The 13th arrondissement is home to engineering graduate schools, Arts et Métiers ParisTech and Télécom ParisTech. The teaching and learning center is settled at the number 151.

Cityscape

Places of interest
 Paris's main Asian district, the Quartier Asiatique, also locally called la Triangle de Choisy or la petite Asie ("Little Asia"), is located in the southeast of the arrondissement. The following can be found in this area:
 Les Olympiades, Super-Italie and various other towers among the tallest in Paris
 Tang Frères and Paristore Asian supermarkets and grocery stores.
 Bibliothèque nationale de France
 Pitié-Salpêtrière Hospital
 Butte-aux-Cailles
 Gare d'Austerlitz
 Gobelins manufactory
 Art Ludique- Le Musée, first French Museum dedicated to the Art of Entertainment
 University of Chicago Center in Paris
 6 Villa des Gobelins - residence of Hồ Chí Minh from July 1919 to July 1921
 Stade Sébastien Charléty, home of football clubs Paris FC and Paris Saint-Germain Féminines
 Cité de la Mode et du Design, a creative schedule of events built around innovation, culture, and style.
 Street Art 13 frescoes.
 Teddy bears of the Gobelins, photographed around the neighborhood
 Parc Kellermann, a public park

Streets and squares 
 Rue Zadkine
Rue Paul-Klee
Rue Marcel-Duchamp
 Boulevard de la Zone
 Place d'Italie
Place Jean-Michel Basquiat

See also

 Chinese community in Paris
 Vietnamese community in Paris

References

External links

 
Chinatowns in Europe
Ethnic enclaves in France
Little Saigons